The Book of generations is a hypothesized Hebrew text which lies behind two passages in the Book of Genesis. The text is no longer extant, but according to the hypothesis, portions of it survive as part of Genesis. Frank Moore Cross demonstrated that the text could be separated from the other sources, which are substantially larger in comparison.

The only surviving portions of the Book of Generations consist of Genesis 5:1-32 and 11:10-26, comprising an unbroken lineage from Adam to Abraham. It may, however, have once have extended as far as Jacob.

See also
 Sumerian kings list

References

External links
 The Book of Generations at Wikiversity, using the King James Version

Book of Genesis
Bible content